Exercise Tiger, or Operation Tiger, was one of a series of large-scale rehearsals for the D-Day invasion of Normandy, which took place in April 1944 on Slapton Sands in Devon. Coordination and communication problems resulted in friendly fire injuries during the exercise, and an Allied convoy positioning itself for the landing was attacked by E-boats of Nazi Germany's Kriegsmarine, resulting in the deaths of at least 749 American servicemen.

Because of the impending invasion of Normandy, the incident was under the strictest secrecy at the time and was only minimally reported afterwards.

Exercise

Landing operations
In late 1943, as part of the build-up to D-day, the British government set up a training ground at Slapton Sands, Devon, to be used by Force "U", the American forces tasked with landing on Utah Beach. Slapton Beach was selected for its similarity to Utah Beach: a gravel beach, followed by a strip of land and then a lake. Approximately 3,000 local residents in the area of Slapton, now South Hams District of Devon, were evacuated. Some had never left their villages before being evacuated.

Landing exercises started in December 1943. Exercise Tiger was one of the larger exercises that took place in April and May 1944. The exercise was to last from 22 April until 30 April 1944, and covered all aspects of the invasion, culminating in a beach landing at Slapton Sands. On board nine large tank landing ships (LSTs), the 30,000 troops prepared for their mock landing, which also included a live-firing exercise.

Protection for the exercise area came from the Royal Navy. Four O-class destroyers, three Motor Torpedo Boats and two Motor Gun Boats patrolled the entrance to Lyme Bay while three Motor Torpedo Boats were stationed off Cherbourg, where German E-boats were based.

The first phase of the exercise focused on marshalling and embarkation drills, and lasted from 22 to 25 April. On the evening of 26 April the first wave of assault troops boarded their transports and set off, the plan being to simulate the Channel crossing by taking a roundabout route through Lyme Bay, in order to arrive off Slapton at first light on 27 April.

Friendly fire incident
The first practice assault took place on the morning of 27 April and was marked by an incident involving friendly fire. H-hour was set for 07:30, and was to include live ammunition to acclimatise the troops to the sights, sounds and even smells of a naval bombardment. During the landing itself, live rounds were to be fired over the heads of the incoming troops by forces on land, for the same reason. This followed an order made by General Dwight D. Eisenhower, the Supreme Allied Commander, who felt that the men must be hardened by exposure to real battle conditions. The exercise was to include naval bombardment by ships of Force U Bombardment Group fifty minutes prior to the landing.

Several of the landing ships for that morning were delayed, and the officer in charge, American Admiral Don P. Moon, decided to delay H-hour for 60 minutes, until 08:30. Some of the landing craft did not receive word of the change. Landing on the beach at their original scheduled time, the second wave came under fire, suffering an unknown number of casualties. Rumours circulated along the fleet that as many as 450 men were killed.

Battle of Lyme Bay

On the day after the first practice assaults, early on the morning of 28 April, the exercise was blighted when Convoy T-4, consisting of eight LSTs carrying vehicles and combat engineers of the 1st Engineer Special Brigade, was attacked by German E-boats in Lyme Bay. Nine German E-boats had left Cherbourg shortly after midnight, avoiding the British MTBs watching the port area and patrols in the English Channel.

Around 0130 hrs six E-boats of the 5. S-Boot Flottille (5th E-Boat Flotilla) commanded by Korvettenkapitän Bernd Klug saw eight dark ships and split into three pairs to attack with torpedoes: first Rotte 3 (S-136 & S-138), then Rotte 2 under Oberleutnant zur See Goetschke (S-140 & S-142), then Rotte 1 (S-100 & S-143). The final three E-boats of the nine, S-Boot Flottille commanded by Korvettenkapitän Götz Freiherr von Mirbach (S-130, S-145 & S-150), saw the red flares for attack (or may have heard the contact report sent at 0203 hrs) and joined the attack. After, within the Rotte 1 pair, S-100 collided with S-143 and damaged its superstructure, the boats decided to leave, masking their retreat with smoke while sending another contact report. S-145 attacked the ships with gunfire. The attack ended circa at 0330 hrs. The Germans had been puzzled by the strange-looking ships which did not look like merchantmen. They estimated that they were some type of American landing ship with a shallow draft as the initial torpedoes from Rotte 3 and Rotte 2 seemed to miss.

Of the two ships assigned to protect the convoy, only one was present. , a corvette, was leading the LSTs in a straight line, a formation that later drew criticism since it presented an easy target to the E-boats. The second ship that was supposed to be present, a World War I destroyer, had been in a collision with an LST, suffered structural damage and left the convoy to be repaired at Plymouth. Because the LSTs and British naval headquarters were operating on different frequencies, the American forces did not know this.  was dispatched as a replacement, but did not arrive in time to help protect the convoy.

Casualties
  was set on fire but eventually made it back to shore with the loss of 13 Navy personnel.
  was torpedoed and sunk with the loss of 202 US Army/US Navy personnel.
  sank within six minutes of being torpedoed with the loss of 424 Army and Navy personnel.

The remaining ships and their escort fired back and the E-boats made no more attacks. In total, 749 servicemen (551 United States Army and 198 United States Navy) were killed during Exercise Tiger. Many servicemen drowned or died of hypothermia in the cold sea while waiting to be rescued. Many had not been shown how to put on their lifebelt correctly, and placed it around their waist, the only available spot because of their large backpacks. In some cases this meant that when they jumped into the water, the weight of their combat packs flipped them upside down, dragging their heads under water and drowning them. Dale Rodman, who travelled on LST-507, commented: "The worst memory I have is setting off in the lifeboat away from the sinking ship and watching bodies float by". The 248 bodies that were recovered were sent to Brookwood Cemetery in Surrey on 29 April. The unit with the most casualties was the 1st Special Engineer Brigade.

Aftermath

Strategic consequences
Vice Admiral Kirk of the US Navy immediately realised the huge damage E-boats could inflict on slow-moving landing craft with minimal defences and feared that the German success in Lyme Bay could be repeated on D-day, with disastrous consequences. On 4 May 1944 he sent a signal to Admiral Ramsay of the Royal Navy arguing for heavy aerial and naval bombardment of Cherbourg:

Other consequences
The attack was reported up the chain of command to Dwight D. Eisenhower on 29 April. Eisenhower was enraged that the convoy was sailing in a straight line and not zig-zagging, that the attack reduced reserves of LSTs, that it indicated to the Germans that the Allies were nearly ready to invade, and that ten American officers with knowledge of the invasion were missing. The missing officers had BIGOT-level clearance for D-Day, meaning that they knew the invasion plans and could have compromised the invasion should they have been captured alive. As a result, the invasion was nearly called off until the bodies of all ten victims were found. He ordered that all the officers' bodies, and any incriminating papers they might have had, be found. The ten American officers were from the 1st Engineer Special Brigade; they knew when and where the Utah and Omaha landings were to take place, and had seen the amphibious DUKWs that were to take the Rangers to below Pointe du Hoc. Merely knowing that exercises were taking place at Slapton was of interest to the Germans; the historian Stephen Ambrose suggests that the insistence in May by Hitler that the Normandy area be reinforced was because "he noticed the similarity between Slapton Sands and the Cotentin beach".

There were reports that S-boats were nosing through the wreckage for information with searchlights or torches. The shore batteries around nearby Salcombe Harbour had visually spotted unidentified small craft, but were ordered not to fire on them as it would have shown the Germans that the harbour was defended and disclosed the battery position.

As a result of official embarrassment and concerns over potential leaks just prior to the real invasion, all survivors were sworn to secrecy about the events by their superiors. There is little information about exactly how individual soldiers and sailors died. The US Department of Defense stated in 1988 that record-keeping may have been inadequate aboard some of the ships, and the most pertinent log books were lost at sea. A ninth LST was scheduled to be in the convoy, but was damaged. Author Nigel Lewis speculates that some or all of its infantrymen may have been aboard LST 507 when it went down. Various eyewitness accounts detail hasty treatment of casualties and rumours circulated of unmarked mass graves in Devon fields.

Several changes resulted from mistakes made in Exercise Tiger:
 Radio frequencies were standardised; the British escort vessels were late and out of position due to radio problems, and a signal about the E-boats' presence was not picked up by the LSTs.
 Better lifejacket training was provided for landing troops
 Plans were made for small craft to pick up floating survivors on D-Day.

Official histories contain little information about the tragedy. Some commentators have called it a cover-up, but the initial critical secrecy about Tiger may have merely resulted in longer-term quietude. In his book The Forgotten Dead: Why 946 American Servicemen Died Off The Coast Of Devon In 1944 – And The Man Who Discovered Their True Story, published in 1988, Ken Small declares that the event "was never covered up; it was 'conveniently forgotten'".

The casualty statistics from Tiger were not released by Supreme Headquarters Allied Expeditionary Force (SHAEF) until August 1944, along with the casualties of the actual D-Day landings. This report stated that there were 442 army dead and 197 navy, for a total of 639. (However, Moon had reported on 30 April that there were 749 dead.) Charles B. MacDonald, author and former deputy chief historian at the U.S. Army Center of Military History, notes that information from the SHAEF press release appeared in the August issue of Stars and Stripes. MacDonald surmises that the press release went largely unnoticed in light of the larger events that were occurring at the time. The story was detailed in at least three books at the end of the war, including Captain Harry C. Butcher's My Three Years With Eisenhower (1946), and in several publications and speeches.

Memorials

Devon resident and civilian Ken Small took on the task of seeking to commemorate the event, after discovering evidence of the aftermath washed up on the shore while beachcombing in the early 1970s.

In 1974, Small bought from the U.S. Government the rights to a submerged tank from the 70th Tank Battalion discovered in his search. In 1984, with the aid of local residents and diving firms, he raised the tank, which now stands as a memorial to the incident. The local authority provided a plinth on the seafront to put the tank on, and erected a plaque in memory of the men killed. The American military honoured and supported him. Small died of cancer in March 2004, a few weeks before the 60th anniversary of Exercise Tiger.

The Slapton Sands memorial plaque reads:

A plaque was erected, in 1995, at Arlington National Cemetery entitled "Exercise Tiger Memorial". In 1997, the Exercise Tiger Association established a memorial to Exercise Tiger veterans in Mexico, Missouri. It is a 5,000-pound stern anchor from an LST of the Suffolk County Class on permanent loan from the Navy. In 2006, the Slapton Sands Memorial Tank Limited (a non-profit organisation, one of whose directors is Small's son Dean) established a more prominent memorial listing the names of all the victims of the attacks on Exercise Tiger.

In 2012, a memorial plaque was erected at Utah Beach, Normandy, on the wall of a former German anti-aircraft bunker. An M4 Sherman tank stands as a memorial to Exercise Tiger at Fort Rodman Park in New Bedford, Massachusetts.

In 2019, the US servicemen who died in the exercise were remembered in an art installation by artist Martin Barraud. Bootprints of 749 troops were laid out on Slapton Sands to mark the 75th anniversary of Exercise Tiger. Commemorative bootprints and special plaques made by veterans to represent each of the 22,763 British and Commonwealth servicemen and women who were killed on D-Day and during the Battle of Normandy in the summer of 1944 were sold. Mr Barraud said:

In popular culture 
 Someone In Time by Stuart Cowley is a 2019 novel based around the events of "Exercise Tiger" from the point of view of fictitious people and their individual stories.
 Sanford Margalith's novel Captains is a fictionalised account of his experiences during the Slapton Sands incident.
 A major plotline of Foyle's War was based on the Slapton Sands disaster, in the episode entitled "All Clear".
 The Jack Higgins novel "Night of the Fox" begins with a fictionalised account of the Battle of Lyme Bay and the primary plot involves rescuing one of the BIGOT officers.
 The Leslie Thomas novel The Magic Army is a fictionalised account of the evacuation of Slapton and the events leading up to the Slapton Sands disaster.
 A major plot line of James R. Benn's novel The Rest Is Silence, one of the Billy Boyle series, is based on Operation Tiger at Slapton Sands.
 The exercise and American soldiers who participated in it feature in the plot for Michael Morpurgo's 2005 children's novel The Amazing Story of Adolphus Tips.
 English guitarist Martin Simpson has written a song about Ken Small's salvage of the Sherman tank.
 The J D Salinger short story "For Esme with Love and Squalor" is narrated by an American serviceman suffering Post Traumatic Stress Disorder in Devon after the Slapton Sands massacre.

Notes

References

Sources

Further reading

External links

 Exercise Tiger at The Naval Historical Center
 Operation Tiger-The great Portland cover-up
 Slapton Village Tiger Page
 The Official Exercise Tiger Memorial Website
 History of Exercise Tiger from the West Virginia State Archives
 The Official UK Charity for Exercise Tiger
 Oral history interview with John Maltese, a survivor of Exercise Tiger from the Veterans History Project at Central Connecticut State University

1944 in England
Tiger
Friendly fire incidents of World War II
Military history of Devon
Military history of the United Kingdom during World War II
Tiger
Western European theatre of World War II